Manaowan Sitsongpeenong (Thai: มะนาวหวาน ศิษย์สองพี่น้อง, ; born September 27, 1996) is a Thai Muay Thai kickboxer. As of June 2016, he is the current Rajadamnern Stadium welterweight champion. He is ranked #3 by Lumpinee Stadium at Welterweight (147 lb), #8 by Thailand PAT at welterweight, and #3 by World Boxing Council Muaythai at welterweight.

Biography and career
Manaowan Sitsongpeenong was born as Nopparat Pirkratok in Sa Kaew, Thailand on September 27, 1996. He had his first fight at the age of 12 in 2007.

On 5 March 2016, he fought in The Champion Muaythai 4-Man Tournament(70 kg) in Pattaya, Thailand. He first won against Teetong P. Rungsawat, then beat Choke Eminent Air in the finals.

On 24 April 2016, he fought Greg Petchsaman on Super Muaythai Workpoint and won via technical knock out in the second round.

On 27 May 2016, he fought Aziz Hlali and won the Rajadamnern Stadium title at 147 lb.

He is set to fight in the Toyota REVO 8-Man Tournament in June 2016.

Titles and achievements

Titles
 2017 WBC Muaythai Welterweight World Champion (147 lb)
 2016 Rajadamnern Stadium Welterweight Champion (147 lb)
 2016 The Champions Muaythai 4-ManTournament Champion (70 kg) (Former)

Current ranking
 N°3 Lumpinee Stadium at Welterweight (147 lb), May 2016
 N°8 Thailand (PAT) at Welterweight (147 lb), May 2015
 N°3 WBC Muaythai at Welterweight (147 lb), May 2016

Accomplishments

Kickboxing record

|-  style="background:#fbb;"
| 2017-12-06 || Loss||align=left| Sorgraw Petchyindee || || Thailand || Decision || 5 || 3:00
|-  style="background:#fbb;"
| 2017-05-13 || Loss ||align=left| Ilias Bulaid || Fight League 6 || Hoofddorp, Netherlands || KO (Spinning Back Kick to the Body) || 2 || 
|-
|-  style="background:#fbb;"
| 2017-04-01 || Loss ||align=left| Petchtanong Banchamek || Super Muaythai Workpoint || Bangkok, Thailand || Decision || 3 || 3:00
|-
|-  style="background:#fbb;"
| 2017-02-23 || Loss ||align=left| Fabio Pinca || Best of Siam, Rajadamnern Stadium || Bangkok, Thailand || Decision  || 5 || 3:00
|-
! style=background:white colspan=9 |
|-  style="background:#cfc;"
| 2017-01-28 || Win ||align=left| Morgan Adrar || Burning Series 6 || Paris, France || Decision  || 5 || 3:00 
|-
! style=background:white colspan=9 |
|-  style="background:#fbb;"
| 2016-12-17 || Loss ||align=left| Liu Xiangming || Glory of Heroes - Rise 5  || Nanning, China || Decision  || 3 || 3:00
|-
|-  style="background:#fbb;"
| 2016-10-22 || Loss ||align=left| Dylan Salvador || La Nuit Des Challenges 16  || Lyon, France || Decision  || 5 || 3:00
|-
|-  style="background:#cfc;"
| 2016-08-03 || Win ||align=left| Omer Luktupfah || Super Muaythai Workpoint || Bangkok, Thailand || Decision || 3 || 3:00
|-
|-  style="background:#fbb;"
| 2016-06-24 || Loss ||align=left| Dejrit Poptheeratham || Toyota Revo 8-Man Tournament, Semi Finals || Hatyai, Thailand || KO || 1 || 
|-
|-  style="background:#cfc;"
| 2016-06-24 || Win ||align=left| Ventino Thibaut || Toyota Revo 8-Man Tournament, Quarter Final || Hatyai, Thailand || Decision || 3 || 3:00
|-
|-  style="background:#cfc;"
| 2016-05-27 || Win ||align=left| Azize Hlali || Best of Siam 8, Rajadamnern Stadium || Bangkok, Thailand|| Decision || 5 || 3:00
|-
! style=background:white colspan=9 |
|-  style="background:#cfc;"
| 2016-04-24 || Win ||align=left| Greg Petchsaman || Super Muaythai Workpoint || Bangkok, Thailand || TKO || 2 || 
|-
|-  style="background:#cfc;"
| 2016-03-05 || Win ||align=left| Choke Eminent Air || The Champion Muaythai 4-Man Tournament, Finals || Pattaya, Thailand || Decision  || 3 || 3:00
|-
! style=background:white colspan=9 |
|-  style="background:#cfc;"
| 2016-03-05 || Win ||align=left| Teetong P. Rungsawat || The Champion Muaythai 4-Man Tournament, Semi Finals || Pattaya, Thailand || Decision || 3 || 3:00
|-
|-  style="background:#fbb;"
| 2016-01-30 || Loss ||align=left| Sorgraw Petchyindee ||  || Thailand || Decision || 5 || 3:00
|-
|-  style="background:#fbb;"
| 2015-12-25 || Loss ||align=left| Petpanomrung Kiatmuu9 || Toyota Vigo Marathon Tournament 2015, Semi Final || Chon Buri, Thailand || Decision || 3 || 3:00
|-  style="background:#fbb;"
| 2015-12-08 || Loss ||align=left| Sorgraw Petchyindee || Lumpinee Stadium || Thailand || Decision || 5 || 3:00
|-
! style=background:white colspan=9 |
|-  style="background:#fbb;"
| 2014-04-19 ||Loss ||align=left| Pornsanae Sitmonchai|| Omnoi Stadium || Bangkok, Thailand || KO || 2 || 
|-  style="background:#fbc;"
! style=background:white colspan=9 |
|-
|-
| colspan=9 | Legend:

See also
List of male kickboxers

References

External links
Sitsongpeenong Muaythai Camp

1996 births
Living people
Lightweight kickboxers
Manaowan Sitsongpeenong
Manaowan Sitsongpeenong